Events during the year 2017 in Northern Ireland.

Incumbents
 First Minister – Arlene Foster (until 9 January)
 deputy First Minister – Martin McGuinness (until 9 January)
 Secretary of State for Northern Ireland – James Brokenshire

Events 

 January - The deputy First Minister, Martin McGuinness resigns in protest of the handling of the Renewable Heat Incentive scandal.
 2 March - 2017 Northern Ireland Assembly election takes place.
 8 April - Robin Swann announced as the new Ulster Unionist Party leader.
 8 June - UK General election takes place.

The arts
 June - Agreement for filming of Krypton (TV series) at Belfast Harbour Studios.

Sports

Deaths 

 27 January – Billy Simpson, footballer (b. 1929)
 1 March – P. J. Bradley, politician (b. 1940)
 21 March – Martin McGuinness, Sinn Féin politician and presidential candidate, amyloidosis (b. 1950).
 4 June – Patrick G. Johnston, physician (b. 1958)
 11 June – Alan Campbell, Pentecostal pastor (b. 1949)
 25 June – Robert Overend, farmer, businessman and Unionist politician (b. 1930)
 24 October – Glenn Barr, UDA politician and advocate, member of Northern Ireland Assembly and Constitutional Convention (b. 1942)

See also 
 2017 in England
 2017 in Scotland
 2017 in Wales

References 

Northern Ireland